Joseph Kosinski (born May 3, 1974) is an American film director best known for his computer graphics and computer-generated imagery (CGI) work, and for his work in action films. He made his big-screen directorial debut with the 2010 science fiction film Tron: Legacy, the sequel to the 1982 film Tron. He also directed the 2013 science fiction film Oblivion and the 2022 action drama film Top Gun: Maverick, the sequel to the 1986 film Top Gun. His previous work has primarily been with CGI-related television commercials including the "Starry Night" commercial for Halo 3 and the award-winning "Mad World" commercial for Gears of War.

Life and career 
Kosinski grew up in Marshalltown, Iowa, the son of Patricia (née Provost) of French-Canadian descent, and Joel Kosinski, a doctor of Polish descent.

His first major film was the special effects-heavy Tron: Legacy. The film was in Disney Digital 3-D and IMAX 3D, with a release of December 2010 and grossed $400 million worldwide.

After moving to Los Angeles in 2005, he began writing a film treatment which would eventually develop into an unpublished graphic novel by the title Oblivion for Radical Comics. In August 2010, Walt Disney Pictures acquired the rights to the work. William Monahan worked on the screenplay for a film adaptation. In March 2011, it was reported that Karl Gajdusek would rewrite the screenplay. Attempts to keep the film with a PG rating were unsuccessful, leading to Disney giving up the rights which were acquired by Universal Pictures, and agreed to a PG-13 rating. The $120-million-budgeted Oblivion began filming in March 2012, with Tom Cruise in the lead role, and was released in April 2013 to mixed reviews and grossed $286 million worldwide.

Kosinski was confirmed to direct the third Tron film in early 2015, but in May of the same year it was announced that Disney had canceled the project. In 2017, he directed Only the Brave, originally titled Granite Mountain, based on the true story of the Granite Mountain Hotshots (wildland firefighters). In June 2017 it was announced he was set to direct the sequel to Top Gun, titled Top Gun: Maverick. In June 2020, he was hired direct the remake of Twister, which was announced by Universal Pictures, the original film's international distributor, but in October 2022, Kosinski stepped down after the project was repurposed into a legacy-sequel, Twisters, was announced and replaced by Lee Isaac Chung as director.

Kosinski is also set to direct an untitled Formula One racing film, reteaming with Top Gun: Maverick producer Jerry Bruckheimer and screenwriter Ehren Kruger, with racing driver Lewis Hamilton also serving as producer. The project, acquired by Apple Studios in June 2022, will star Brad Pitt and receive an exclusive theatrical run "of at least 30 days" before streaming on Apple TV+.

Kosinski has been attached to several as-of-now-unmade projects, including remakes of '70s science-fiction films Logan's Run, The Black Hole, the science-fiction film Archangels, an untitled action-thriller from Halt and Catch Fire writers Christopher Cantwell and Christopher C. Rogers, and The Twilight Zone.

Academia 
Kosinski is an alumnus of Columbia Graduate School of Architecture, Planning and Preservation (GSAPP), and was an adjunct assistant professor of architecture helping students in 3D modeling and graphics. In 2008, he spoke in detail about his education in architecture, pushing the technological envelope in commercials and his eventual progression to feature films.

Awards 
2007 AICP Show – Best Visual Effects for the Gears of War commercial "Mad World" – Nominated
AICP Best Visual Effects Award for his Assassin's Creed "Unity" and Destiny "Become Legend" commercials – Nominated
47th Saturn Awards for Best Film Director for Top Gun: Maverick – Nominated

Filmography 
Feature film
 Tron: Legacy (2010)
 Oblivion (2013) (Also producer)
 Only the Brave (2017)
 Top Gun: Maverick (2022)
 Spiderhead (2022)

Short film

Music video
"Hold My Hand" – Lady Gaga (2022)

Commercials
Gears of War - Mad World (2006)
Halo 3 - Starry Night (2007)
Doom - Cinematic Trailer (2016)

Frequent collaborators

References

External links 

 Personal website including professional reel
 

Living people
Skydance Media people
Film directors from Iowa
People from Marshalltown, Iowa
Screenwriters from Iowa
Columbia Graduate School of Architecture, Planning and Preservation alumni
Columbia Graduate School of Architecture, Planning and Preservation faculty
American male screenwriters
American people of Polish descent
English-language film directors
Television commercial directors
Action film directors
Science fiction film directors
1974 births